Peter Meyer may refer to:

Sportspeople
 Peter Meyer (footballer) (born 1940), German footballer
 Peter Meyer (figure skater), American figure skater in 1960 United States Figure Skating Championships
 Peter Meyer (skeleton racer), German skeleton racer in 2004 German Skeleton Championship

Others
 Sir Peter Meyer (c. 1664-1728), English merchant
 Peter Meyer (astrophysicist) (1920–2002), German-born American astrophysicist
 Peter Meyer, German musician, member of the band Puhdys

See also
 Peter Mayer (1936–2018), American independent publisher